Loughmacrory is a village and townland (of 1651 acres) in County Tyrone, Northern Ireland. The village is situated 8 miles (13 km) east of Omagh in the historic barony of Omagh East and the civil parish of Termonmaguirk. it had a population of 237 in the 2001 Census. Loughmacrory has houses, shops, a church and a primary school. There is also an old mill and ancient cairns nearby.

Loughmacrory is part of the Fermanagh and Omagh District Council area.

Sport
Loughmacrory St. Teresa's is the local Gaelic Athletic Association club.

References

NI Neighbourhood Information Service
Megalithomania - Loughmacrory wedge tomb
Omagh District Council
Discover Northern Ireland
NI Conflict Archive on the Internet

External links

Loughmacrory Wedge Tomb

Villages in County Tyrone
Civil parish of Termonmaguirk